The Capital Wheel is a Ferris wheel at National Harbor, Maryland, just outside Washington, D. C., in the United States. It opened on May 23, 2014.

The wheel was conceived by National Harbor developer Milton Peterson and inspired by the Roue de Paris. Landmarks visible from inside the wheel include the National Harbor, the Washington Monument, the city of Alexandria, and Georgetown University. The  diameter wheel carries 42 climate-controlled passenger gondolas, each able to seat eight people, including a VIP gondola that can be rented for weddings or celebrations. The wheel has programmable special-effects lighting and seasonal concessions at the base of the ride from the Wolfgang Puck restaurant chain.

The entire structure is 175 (52.6 m) feet tall.

Design and construction 
The Capital Wheel arrived at National Harbor by two of Cianbro's barges on February 18, 2014, pushed by a tugboat from Baltimore to National Harbor via the Chesapeake Bay and Potomac River. Smith's Shipyard provided the 1,300 horsepower tug, named The Rising Sun and measuring 60 feet long by 22 feet wide (18.3m by 6.7m). Cianbro's Manitowoc 4100 Series 2 crane has a maximum lifting capacity of 460,000 pounds. 

The materials barge carried  of galvanized steel base and tower legs and other miscellaneous components weighing  for The Capital Wheel.

The Capital Wheel weighs approximately 320 tons (281,227 kg), exclusive of the base, which weighs an additional 140 tons (127,006 kg). The structure's eight legs support a  axle, which took a full day to install. Cianbro attached the Swiss-made passenger gondolas four at a time to the wheel structure, followed by a 90-degree wheel rotation, until wheel was fully assembled.

Four 50-horsepower variable drive units rotate the Wheel at a speed of 1.5 rotations per minute. Each passenger ride lasts 12–15 minutes. The Capital Wheel has 1.6 million LED lights with a spectrum of 16,387,064 colors.

Passenger gondolas 
The Capital Wheel has 42 climate-controlled gondolas, including one VIP gondola, and can carry 336 passengers at maximum. CWA Construction, a Swiss manufacturer, built the passenger gondolas that Cianbro installed for The Capital Wheel.

The gondolas have interior lights and two-way, individual communication with the operator, and their doors open facing the harbor, for an unobstructed view of the Washington Monument, U.S. Capitol, Alexandria, Virginia, and Prince George's County, Maryland.

Ride Availability and Cost 
On its regular schedule as of December 2020, the Capital Wheel is open from noon to 8 P.M. Monday through Thursday and 10 A.M. to 8 P.M. Friday through Sunday. Tickets cost $15 for adults, $13.50 for seniors, and $11.25 for children. The VIP gondola costs $50 and can seat 4 people.

References

External links

Ferris wheels in the United States
Amusement rides introduced in 2014
Amusement rides manufactured by Chance Rides
2014 establishments in Maryland